The 1990–91 All-Ireland Senior Club Football Championship was the 21st staging of the All-Ireland Senior Club Football Championship since its establishment by the Gaelic Athletic Association in 1970-71.

Baltinglass entered the championship as the defending champions, however, they were beaten by Thomas Davis in the Leinster Club Championship.

On 17 March 1991, Lavey won the championship following a 2-09 to 0-10 defeat of Salthill-Knocknacarra in the All-Ireland final at Croke Park. It remains their only championship title.

Results

Munster Senior Club Football Championship

First round

Semi-finals

Final

All-Ireland Senior Club Football Championship

Quarter-final

Semi-finals

Final

Championship statistics

Miscellaneous

 Salthill-Knocknacarra won the Connacht Club Championship title for the first time in their history.
 Thomas Davis won the Leinster Club Championship for the first time in their history.
 Lavey won the Ulster Club Championship for the first time in their history.

References

1990 in Gaelic football
1991 in Gaelic football